Lauren Turner (born May 8, 1986) is an American singer and songwriter from New Orleans, Louisiana. Turner placed in the top 12 girls on the tenth season of American Idol.

Early life
Turner was born in New Orleans, Louisiana, was raised in nearby Covington, Louisiana, and graduated from Covington High School.

American Idol

Overview
Turner auditioned for the tenth season of American Idol in New Orleans, Louisiana. She made it to the semi-final round and performed "Seven Day Fool" by Etta James.  While the judges expressed their approval and enthusiasm for her performance she was eliminated and did not perform in the finals. Judge Jennifer Lopez expressed regret at her elimination in an interview with Rolling Stone.

Post-Idol
Turner toured Europe and Asia with Armed Forces Entertainment in 2012.  She collaborated with Tom Riepl and Huey Lewis on Riepl's cover of Lewis' song "Bad is Bad." Turner has released a self-published single titled "Deja Vu," which she wrote and co-produced, that was featured on Reverbnation.com's crowd picks for the weeks of May 26, 2015 and June 30, 2015.

References

External links
Lauren Turner on American Idol
Official Website

1986 births
21st-century American singers
Living people
American Idol participants
Singers from Louisiana